Empire is an unincorporated community in Walker County, Alabama, United States. Empire has a post office with ZIP code 35063.

Notable people
Dan Bankhead, former Major League Baseball player. He was the first black pitcher in Major League Baseball, and was the brother of Sam Bankhead.
Sam Bankhead, Negro leagues player from 1930 to 1950
Zeke Clements, country music singer, known as "The Dixie Yodeler"

References

Unincorporated communities in Walker County, Alabama
Unincorporated communities in Alabama